The institute of physics is a part of the Faculty of natural sciences of the Pavol Jozef Šafárik University in Košice in Slovakia. Its director is currently Michal Jaščur. Primary activities of the institute are:

 education of students trying to obtain a master's degree in physics or in any other subject in combination with physics.
 scientific research within areas of magnetism, physics of low temperatures, nuclear physics, biophysics, theoretical physics, astrophysics and theory of physics education.

Departments

Department of Theoretical Physics and Astrophysics 

The Department of Theoretical Physics and Astrophysics provides education within all basic disciplines of theoretical physics. Through series of mandatory science courses, it educates students for specialization either in physics of condensed matter, nuclear physics, computer physics or astrophysics.

The research at the department employs:

 theoretical study of magnetic properties of certain materials and phase transitions in magnetic systems
 development of mathematical tools in geophysics
 theory of elementary particles
 physical properties of interacting binaries (binary stars)

The research of the department involves collaboration with:

Department of Solid State Physics, University of Lodz, Lodz, Poland
Department of Applied Science, Kyushu University, Fukuoka, Japan
Department of Natural Science Informatics, Nagoya University, Nagoya, Japan
Gerhard Mercator Universität Duisburg, Duisburg, Germany
Joint Institute of Nuclear Research, Dubna, Russia
Department of Theoretical Physics, Uzhgorod State University, Uzhgorod, Ukraine
University of Athens, Athens, Greece
Institut d'Astrophysique, Paris, France
Dipartimento di Scienze Fisiche, Universita di Napoli "Federico II", Napoli, Italy
Astronomical institute of Czech academy of sciences, Czech Republic

Department of Biophysics 

The scientific work of the department has an inter-disciplinary character. Our scientific interest is mainly focused on the investigation of new photosensitizers, which could be used for diagnostic and treatment of cancer diseases.

There is a collaboration of the department with numerous universities and research institutes in the world including both research (common projects) and pedagogical activities (few-months stages of our students abroad, and co-tutoring programs).

International Laser Center, Bratislava, Slovak Republic
Université P. et M. Curie, Paris, France
Centre de Biophysique Moléculaire, Orleans, France
Faculty of Mathematics and Physics, Charles University, Prague, Czech Rep.
Instituto de Estructura de la Materia CSIC, Madrid, Spain
Department of Chemistry, Iowa State University, Ames, USA
Stockholms Universitet, Stockholm, Sweden
Instituto de Ciencias Fotónicas, Barcelona, Spain
Rice University, Houston, USA
Universidad Metropolitana, San Juan, Puerto Rico, USA

Department of Physics of Condensed Matters 

The personnel of the department is participating in the classwork of basic physics courses and also prepares specialized classes devoted to the magnetism, metal physics, low-temperature physics, physics of new advanced materials and experimental techniques. Research programs of our department are focused on magnetic and transport properties of different classes of materials - amorph, nano-structural, low-dimensional and molecular magnets in the temperature range from room temperature down to the lowest temperature of 30 mK.

The department carries out research in collaboration with:

 DESY Hamburg, Germany
 Instituto de Ciencia de Materiales, CSIC, Madrid, Spain
 Faculty of Physics and Mathematics, Charles University and Institute for Physics of Czech academy of sciences
 University of Florida, Gainesville, Florida, USA
 Research center Dresden-Rossendorf, Germany
 IFW Dresden, Germany
 Research center Julich, Germany
 Royal Holloway, University of London, Great Britain
 Institute of nuclear physics, Belehrad, Serbia
 Laboratory of strong magnetic fields, CNRS, Grenoble, France
 College of Chemistry and Molecular Engineering, Peking University, China
 Clark University, Worcester, Ma., USA
 Technical University Clausthal, Germany
 Institute of physics problems of P.L.Kapicu, Russian academy of Sciences, Moskau, Russia
 B. Verkin Institute for Low Temperature Physics and Engineering of the National Academy of Sciences of Ukraine, Charkov, Ukrajina
 V.N. Kharazin Kharkiv National University, Charkov, Ukraine
 State University Užhorod, Užhorod, Ukraine
 Centre for research at very low temperatures CNRS, Grenoble, France
 Cretian University, Heraklion, Greece
 University Bayreuth, Germany

and others.

Department of Nuclear Physics and Sub-nuclear Physics 

The research in a field of nuclear and sub-nuclear physics focuses on high-energy collisions of heavy ions, correlation and spin effects in low-nucleon systems in interactions with protons with light nuclei at medium energies. Special attention is given to a participation of employees on the experiment ALICE of the new LHC collider in the CERN complex and to an experiment STAR on accelerators of BROOKHAVEN.

The department carries out the research with the following institutions:

 European Organization for Nuclear Research - CERN, Geneva, Switzerland
 Joint institute of nuclear research - JINR,  Dubna, Russia
 Institute of nuclear physics - FZ Jülich, Germany
 Brookhaven National Laboratory - BNL, Brookhaven, USA
 Deutsches Elektronen Synchrotron - DESY, Hamburg, Germany

Laboratory of technology transfer

Division of Didactics of Physics

See also 
 Astronomical Institute of Slovak Academy of Sciences

References 

Universities in Slovakia
Institutes associated with CERN